The Green Inferno is a 2013 cannibal horror film directed by Eli Roth, with a screenplay by Roth and Guillermo Amoedo, from a story by Roth. It stars Lorenza Izzo, Ariel Levy, Daryl Sabara, Kirby Bliss Blanton, Sky Ferreira, Magda Apanowicz, Nicolás Martinez, Aaron Burns, Ignacia Allamand, Ramón Llao, and Richard Burgi. The film follows a young woman who joins an activist group that go on an overseas trip, where they eventually run into a cannibalistic tribe.

The movie was inspired by and serves as an homage to Italian cannibal films of the late 1970s and early '80s "cannibal boom", particularly Cannibal Holocaust (1980), which features a film-within-a-film titled The Green Inferno.

The Green Inferno premiered at the 2013 Toronto International Film Festival on September 8, 2013, and was theatrically released on September 25, 2015, by High Top Releasing and BH Tilt. The film earned $12.9 million on a budget of $5 million, and received negative reviews from critics.

Plot
College freshman Justine becomes interested in a student social activism group led by Alejandro and his girlfriend Kara. The group plans a trip to the Amazon rainforest to stop a petrochemical company from forest clearing and displacing native tribes by filming them and streaming footage to raise awareness. Justine suggests she could bring attention to the issue through her father, a United Nations attorney.

The operation is funded by Carlos, a drug dealer who meets the group in Peru. They journey by boat to the construction site and begin their protest, chaining themselves to bulldozers while filming the land clearing. A private militia hired by the company arrives, and when Justine is nearly killed by an officer, the protest goes viral. The group is arrested, but Carlos bribes the police to release them. They depart by plane, but the plane's engine explodes and it crashes in the jungle, killing several people, including Carlos.

As the survivors search for a GPS phone, Kara hears something nearby. However, when she goes to check, a native tribe emerges and kills her with an arrow before tranquilizing the others, taking them to their village, and imprisoning them. As a tribal elder and the Headhunter leader kill Jonah and feed his remains to their tribe, Alejandro reveals the protest was staged to benefit a rival petrochemical company and so he could focus on other activism projects, to the others' dismay. The tribe test Justine, Amy, and Samantha for their virginity. Upon learning Justine is a virgin, they take her away for a genital mutilation ceremony while the other two women are returned. Alejandro tells the group to stay put and wait for the next petrochemical company's clearing crews, but they attempt to escape. Amidst a downpour, they distract a watchman while Samantha escapes and hides in a canoe and Justine is returned but does not remember anything from her ordeal.

The tribe feed the prisoners strange meat. Being a vegan, Amy reluctantly eats, only to discover a chunk of skin in her bowl bearing one of Samantha's tattoos. Realizing they were fed Samantha's remains, Amy breaks the bowl and uses a shard to commit suicide. Seeing an opportunity, Lars stuffs marijuana down Amy's throat, hoping to get the tribe high when they eat her. As his plan succeeds, Justine and Daniel escape, but Alejandro chooses to stay, tranquilizing Lars to keep him company. When Lars regains consciousness, the intoxicated tribe members eat him alive.

Justine and Daniel reach the crash site and find a phone, but are recaptured and returned to the village. The tribe paints and dresses Justine in tribal attire while an elder ties Daniel to a stake, breaks his limbs, and leaves him to be eaten by ants. News of a forest clearing crew's arrival sends the tribe into a frenzy and the warriors leave to confront them, allowing Justine to escape with the help of a sympathetic child she befriended earlier. Daniel begs Justine to kill him, but the child does so after she refuses. Alejandro begs Justine for help, but she abandons him and flees. Encountering the militia in a firefight against the tribe, in which the Headhunter and most of the tribe’s warriors are killed, she convinces an officer that she is an American and uses the phone to pretend to film the fight so the battle would end peacefully, and they fly her to safety.

In New York City, she lies to her father and other government workers in an interview saying that she was the sole survivor of the plane crash, the natives were friendly, and that they helped her group before they were slaughtered by the petrochemical company's militia. Sometime later, Justine sees a group of activists wearing shirts emblazoned with Alejandro's face.

Cast

 Lorenza Izzo as Justine, a college freshman 
 Ariel Levy as Alejandro, leader of an activism group
 Daryl Sabara as Lars
 Kirby Bliss Blanton as Amy
 Magda Apanowicz as Samantha
 Sky Ferreira as Kaycee, Justine's roommate
 Nicolás Martínez as Daniel, one of the college students who goes to Peru with Justine and Alejandro
 Aaron Burns as Jonah
 Ignacia Allamand as Kara, Alejandro's girlfriend
 Ramón Llao as The Bald Headhunter, the cannibalistic leader of the Peruvian tribe
 Richard Burgi as Charles, Justine's Father
 Matías López as Carlos Lincones
 Antonieta Pari as The Village Elder, the matriarch of the Peruvian tribe
 Percy Chumbe as Guard Leader, the unnamed leader of the logging company's hired militia tasked with destroying the forests
 Paz Bascuñán as Lucia (voice)

Production
On May 17, 2012, at the 2012 Cannes Film Festival, Eli Roth announced that he was planning to direct a horror thriller, The Green Inferno, with Worldview Entertainment stating that they would finance and produce the film. Roth wrote the script with Guillermo Amoedo. Production began in Autumn 2012 in Peru and Chile. In October 2012, it was announced that filming was set to begin in November in Peru. On October 25, Roth announced the full cast for the film. Principal photography began in October 2012 in New York City, and shooting in Peru and in some locations in Chile began on November 5, 2012.

Roth said in an interview in February 2013 that he wanted the film to look like a Werner Herzog or Terrence Malick film. He has also said that he was inspired by Italian cannibal films such as Cannibal Holocaust and Cannibal Ferox.

Release
On July 30, 2013, it was announced that The Green Inferno would premiere at the 2013 Toronto International Film Festival. The film was intended to be released theatrically on September 5, 2014, by Open Road Films. However, financial difficulties with the production company Worldview Entertainment caused Open Road to pull it from its original release. The film had secret screenings on September 22, 2013 at Fantastic Fest and on April 25, 2014, at the Stanley Film Festival.

The Green Inferno was eventually theatrically released in the United States on September 25, 2015, by Blumhouse Productions' multi-platform arm BH Tilt and High Top Releasing. It was released in Filipino theaters on September 23, 2015 by Solar Pictures. Two versions of the film were presented there, depending on the cinema chain: an R-13 "sanitized" version with some gory details removed, resulting in five minutes of footage edited out, and the uncut R-18 version.

Reception

Box office
The film opened to 1,540 venues, earning $3.5 million in its opening weekend, ranking ninth place in the domestic box office. At the end of its run, six weeks later on November 5, the film grossed $7.2 million in the United States and Canada, and $5.7 million overseas for a worldwide total of $12.9 million.

Critical reception
On Rotten Tomatoes, the film holds a rating of 38%, based on 101 reviews, with an average rating of 4.9/10. The site's critical consensus reads, "The Green Inferno may not win writer-director Eli Roth many new converts, but fans of his flair for gory spectacle should find it a suitably gruesome diversion." On Metacritic, the film has a score of 38 out of 100, based on 19 critics, indicating "generally unfavorable reviews". CinemaScore audiences gave the film an average grade of "C−" on an A+ to F scale.

The film received a glowing response from horror novelist Stephen King, who wrote that the film is "like a glorious throwback to the drive-in movies of my youth: bloody, gripping, hard to watch, but you can't look away." Todd Gilchrist of The Wrap gave the film a negative review, stating "Unfortunately, Roth’s abundant gore fails to either offend or exhilarate." Meredith Borders of Birth. Movies. Death., reporting from Fantasia Fest, gave the film a more positive notice: "The Green Inferno never lets up: it barrels ahead, exuberant and relentless in its brutality, never giving the audience a second to unclench. It's a feast for gorehounds, one with an unsubtle message about the way that uninformed activism harms more than it helps. And it's a total blast."

Controversy
The film was criticized by Survival International, which campaigns for indigenous peoples and indigenous peoples living in voluntary isolation, as reinforcing  colonialism and respectively neocolonialism, as well as their stigmas against indigenous peoples, portraying them as savage. Roth dismissed this argument as unimportant for stopping exploitation: "The idea that a fictional movie about a fictional tribe could somehow hurt indigenous people when gas companies are tearing these villages apart on a daily basis is simply absurd. These companies don't need an excuse—they have one—the natural resources in the ground.  They can window-dress things however they like, but nobody will destroy a village because they didn't like a character in a movie, they'll do it because they want to get rich by draining what's under the village. The fear that somehow a movie would give them ammunition to destroy a tribe all sounds like misdirected anger and frustration that the corporations are the ones controlling the fates of these uncontacted tribes."

Home media
The Green Inferno was released on DVD and Blu-ray on January 5, 2016, by Universal Home Entertainment. The release features a director's cut and an audio commentary by Roth, López, Izzo, Burns, Blanton and Sabara.

Potential sequel
On September 7, 2013, it was announced that a sequel would be produced, titled Beyond the Green Inferno and directed by Nicolás López. As of May 2016, there have been no further updates, other than articles referring to the original 2013 announcement and a single unsubstantiated comment, with no production details, that a sequel is still under consideration.

References

Further reading

External links

 
 
 
 

2013 films
2010s English-language films
English-language Peruvian films
English-language Chilean films
English-language Canadian films
English-language Spanish films
2013 horror films
2010s adventure films
2013 horror thriller films
American adventure films
American independent films
American horror thriller films
American splatter films
Adventure horror films
Films about cannibalism
Films directed by Eli Roth
Films produced by Eli Roth
Films set in jungles
Films shot in Chile
Films shot in New York City
Films shot in Peru
Film controversies in the United Kingdom
Obscenity controversies in film
Political controversies in film
Films with screenplays by Eli Roth
Blumhouse Productions films
Worldview Entertainment films
Open Road Films films
2010s American films